The Western Daly languages are a small family of Australian aboriginal languages that share common grammatical forms.  They are: 
Maranunggu (Emmi; Menhthe dialect)
Marrithiyel (Bringen: Marri Ammu, Marritjevin, Marridan, Marramanindjdji dialects)
Marri Ngarr (Magati-ge dialect)

Vocabulary
The following basic vocabulary items are from Tryon (1968).

See also 
Daly languages

References 

 
Daly languages
Language families